Boxelder Creek is a stream in the U.S. state of South Dakota. It is a tributary of the Belle Fourche River.

Boxelder Creek was named for the box elder trees on its course.

See also
List of rivers of South Dakota

References

Rivers of Butte County, South Dakota
Rivers of South Dakota